Adidas Yeezy (or just Yeezy) was a fashion collaboration between American rapper, designer and entrepreneur Kanye West and German sportswear company Adidas. It offered sneakers in limited edition colorways, as well as shirts, jackets, track pants, socks, slides, lingerie and slippers. The first shoe model ("Boost 750") was released in February 2015. In 2020 Forbes described Yeezy's rise as "one of the great retail stories of the century". Yeezy influenced and inspired a multitude of other fashion brands.

In October 2022, Adidas announced that it terminated its collaboration with West with immediate effect after the rapper made antisemitic remarks through various media outlets.

History

Proposed "Pastelle" line and 2006 meeting 
In 2004, it was rumored that Kanye West was releasing his first brand, Mascotte by K West, to be funded by Roc-A-Wear. West began speaking with Adidas about a collaborative effort in 2006, when Gary Aspden met with him in a recording studio, alongside his manager. West proposed a clothing line called "Pastelle", designed its logos, and discussed the possibility of designing a custom version of the Rod Laver Vintage shoe for Adidas. West designed a shoe for Adidas that year, but talks with the company fell through, and the line was never released.

Departure from Nike and deal with Adidas 
In 2013, after the release of the "Red October" Air Yeezy 2s, Kanye West officially left Nike. Although West described this break as "heartbreaking", he claimed that Nike would not pay him royalties for his shoe designs, instead offering to donate some of the proceeds to a charity of West's choice. This ultimately led West to reach out to Adidas for a deal. Adidas agreed to give him royalties, and West described the CEO of Adidas as "someone who allowed me to build something". Under the partnership with Adidas, West retains 100% ownership of his brand while having full creative control over the products released.

In February 2015, the Adidas and West collaboration officially debuted. "Yeezy Season 1" was highly anticipated and celebrities such as Rihanna, Diddy, and West's then-wife Kim Kardashian were at the introductory fashion show. The line featured heavy inspiration from military designs, which West had stated was driven by 2011 England riots. Bomber jackets, sweatpants, and stylized military jackets were heavily featured in the Yeezy Season 1 collection. While the fashion show started late, many deemed it as a success.

In September 2015, West held a fashion show for a new set of apparel in the Yeezy line, called Yeezy Season 2. Several hundred people were in attendance at the showcase for the line, which critics noted was not particularly dissimilar from the Season 1 line. The line was marked by light pink, tan, army green and olive tones, and featured pieces such as weatherproof boots, sweatpants, cargo jackets, and crew-neck sweatshirts. He later revealed that he began planning the Yeezy Season 2 line the day Yeezy Season 1 launched, and had begun planning his next set of apparel, Yeezy Season 3, not long after the September 2015 showcase. While the line's accompanying shoes were manufactured by Adidas, West opted to manufacture the clothes through other means and have them custom-dyed.

"Yeezy Season 3" also saw notable amounts of success upon their releases. In June 2016, West and Adidas announced an extension of the deal and the launch of a new Yeezy category. West claimed that Yeezy was selling out surprise 40,000-pair drops within minutes.

In 2018, West enlisted the help of Matt George, co-owner of Stussy Canada, to become a strategic advisor for the brand. During this time the annual sales for Adidas Yeezy grew from $15 million to $1.2 billion. George officially became the CEO of Yeezy in September 2018. By 2019, sales for Yeezy's Adidas sneakers generated $1.3 billion in annual revenue. In 2019, Forbes compared Yeezy to Air Jordan in terms of cultural clout and commercial prowess. In 2020, Forbes described Yeezy's ability to rival Air Jordan for "sneaker world supremacy" within just a short period of time as "one of the great retail stories of the century". West was receiving an 11% royalty cut. That year, sales for the sneakers reached nearly $1.7 billion in annual revenue, netting Yeezy $191 million in royalties alone.

In June 2022, West criticized Adidas CEO Kasper Rørsted, accusing the brand of copying his designs and promoting a "Yeezy Day" sales event without his permission. In August 2022, West continued his criticisms, stating that Adidas failed to open Yeezy retail stores as promised. In September 2022, West stated that he would not renew his contract with Adidas once their partnership expires in 2026.

Termination

On October 7, 2022, Adidas placed its partnership with Kanye West under review after he made several antisemitic remarks and wore a "White Lives Matter" T-shirt at a Paris Fashion Week show days earlier. A social media campaign demanding that Adidas cut ties with West began. West continued to make antisemitic remarks through Instagram, Twitter, interviews, and podcasts, stating "I can say antisemitic shit and Adidas cannot drop me". In response to this behavior, Balenciaga, Vogue, Creative Artists Agency and MRC cut ties with West. Pressure on Adidas grew after the Goyim Defense League, an antisemitic hate group, endorsed West.

On October 25, Adidas announced an immediate end to the line, writing: "Ye's recent comments and actions have been unacceptable, hateful and dangerous, and they violate the company's values of diversity and inclusion, mutual respect and fairness." The production of Yeezy-branded products and payments to West ended upon announcement. Yeezy generated $2 billion in annual sales for Adidas, making up around 10% of the brand's total revenue. Adidas said the termination was expected to "have a short-term negative impact of up to $250 million", and warned it could lose $1.3 billion in revenue in 2023. According to Forbes, West's net worth dropped from $2 billion to $400 million because of the deal's end.

In February 2023, Adidas and West reached a deal to sell the remaining $500 million of Yeezy sneakers in 2023. The remodeled contract will reportedly focus solely on the sale of existing inventory of West's shoe line and will not include his clothing line or new designs.

Clothing
"Yeezy Season 1" was released on October 29, 2015, and was the first apparel collection to release from this collaboration. This collection was noted for its stripped-down, ready-to-wear style, which drew on military clothing and flesh-toned colors. The prices ranged from $600 for sweatpants to $3,000 for jackets.  Although the footwear sold out quickly, the apparel collection did not. West revealed in a 2018 interview that he was in talks with Louis Vuitton for a $30 million apparel deal. The deal was not approved by the LVMH board and West was left with no clothing partners. After the "Yeezy Season 1" show, Adidas announced it would no longer be a part of Yeezy apparel, instead focusing on the footwear collection with West.

With Yeezy Season 4 Adidas and West re-introduced several articles of clothing with Adidas branding. Season 6 premiered in January 2018, with an ad campaign featuring porn star Lela Star (noted for her resemblance to Kim Kardashian), as well as Paris Hilton and other models. The participants were made up to look like Kardashian. West would later use Star again as a model for a June 2018 shoe campaign.

Footwear
Adidas Yeezy sneakers were popularized by celebrities including Justin Bieber, Brooklyn Beckham, and Karim Benzema. Most of the shoes utilized Adidas's Boost material.

Yeezy Boost 750
On December 3, 2013, Adidas confirmed a new shoe collaboration deal with West. The initial release of the Adidas Yeezy Boost 750 "Light Brown" was limited to only 9000 pairs and sold out within 10 minutes. Between February 21 and February 28, the Yeezy Boost 750 "Light Brown" was available through a wider range of retailers and boutiques. "After Kanye West left Nike to partner with Adidas in 2015, he claimed his stake in the sneaker game with his first signature shoe: the Yeezy Boost 750."

Yeezy Boost 350

On June 27, 2015, the second shoe from the collaboration, the Yeezy Boost 350 was made available through a worldwide release. The Yeezy Boost 350 marked an entry into "primeknit" technology, utilizing flat knitting machinery amalgamated with synthetic yarns. A preliminary version was made of a combination of petroleum-based ethylene-vinyl acetate (EVA) and foam generated from algae. In October 2015, Footwear News recognized the Yeezy Boost 350 with its Shoe of the Year award. In August 2016, GQ recognized Yeezy Boost 350 as the most influential shoe of the year.

On September 24, 2016, a second version of the shoe, known as Yeezy Boost 350 V2, debuted in a colorway called "Beluga".

Yeezy 950
The Yeezy 950 was first released on October 29, 2015 at select retail stores and online.  It was part of the Yeezy season 1 collection and came in four different colorways: Peyote, Moonrock, Chocolate, and Pirate black. Each shoe was retailed at $399. The Adidas Yeezy 950 extended the partnership outside of the sneaker space with its military-inspired design.

Yeezy 350 Cleat
The Adidas Yeezy 350 Football Boost cleat was for football and it had made its first appearance in a 2016 NFL kickoff game. Texans wide receiver DeAndre Hopkins was fined $6,000 for wearing the cleats because they broke the NFL uniform policy by not having a solid base color.

Yeezy Powerphase Calabasas
The Adidas Powerphase Calabasas was released on March 28, 2017. "The retro sneakers are an update of an Adidas trainer from the '80s. They feature a premium white leather upper with perforated stripes, green Adidas branding, and a red Trefoil logo." A tonal grey colorway released globally on December 9, 2017 for a retail price of $120; a "Core Black" colorway released shortly after on March 17, 2018. After the initial three colorways of the Yeezy Powerphase Calabasas, Adidas continued releasing several Powerphase models without the Yeezy Calabasas branding. Adidas then brought back the 1980s Adidas Trainer model that is "Yeezy-inspired".

Yeezy Boost 700
The Adidas Yeezy Boost 700 debuted during the Yeezy Season 5 fashion show in 2017. The shoe was released on August 12, 2017, for $300, exclusively via Yeezy Supply. At the time, two colorways of white/gum and black were also expected to release in 2018.

On March 23, 2019, the 700 V2 "Geode" colorway was released synchronously with a nationwide lemonade stand charity campaign raising money for the National Alliance of Mental Illness.

On December 23, 2019, a third version of the 700 series, known as Yeezy 700 V3, debuted in a colorway called "Azael".

A new variation of the 700 series, the Yeezy Boost 700 Mnvn, debuted in a colorway known as "Triple Black" on February 8, 2020. Similar to previous models, the shoe differs by displaying the "700" branding on the upper using compact materials.

Yeezy 500
The Adidas Yeezy 500 was released in December 2017, as a pre-order with delivery slated for March 2018. The debut colorway was known as "Desert Rat".

A high-top variation of the model, known as the Yeezy 500 High, was released in December 2019. The debut colorway was known as "Slate". The following releases including "Blush", "Enflame" and "Clay".

Yeezy Boost 380
The first Adidas Yeezy Boost 380 was released in December 2019, as a surprise release on West's clothing launch site Yeezy Supply. The debut colorway was known as "Alien."

Yeezy Slide
Adidas Yeezy slides are lightweight EVA slippers released in December 2019.

Yeezy Qntm Bsktbl
The Yeezy Qntm Bsktbl was released in the spring of 2020 and serves as a performance version of the Yeezy Qntm (Lifestyle Model) geared for the hardwood.

Yeezy Foam Runner
The Yeezy Foam Runner is the first Adidas Yeezy shoe made in the United States and first released exclusively through Yeezy Supply on June 26, 2020. The shoe retailed for $75 and was partially made of foam generated from algae. The debut colorway was known as "Ararat".

Yeezy 450
The Adidas Yeezy 450 debuted on March 6, 2021 with a debut colorway called "Cloud White", which was later followed by "Dark Slate".

Yeezy Knit Runner
The Adidas Yeezy Knit Runner (stylized as Knit Rnr) debuted on September 23, 2021, with a debut colorway called "Sulfur." The shoe retailed at $200 USD. The Knit Runner takes inspiration from the Yeezy Foam Runner silhouette while being predominantly made of knitted material.

Yeezy Nsltd Boot 
The Adidas Yeezy Nsltd Bt (meaning Insulated Boot) debuted on November 5, 2021, with a "khaki" colorway. These boots retailed at $340 USD.

Yeezy 1050
The Adidas Yeezy 1050 was shown first back in July 22, 2021 during one of Ye's listening parties in the Atlanta Mercedes-Benz Stadium for his 10th studio album, Donda, which was worn along with his other Yeezy apparel. The first colorway is called "Hi-Res" as an orange high-top yet shaped as a skinny kind of boot. The release date for this item is still unknown yet speculated to retail for $400 USD.

Notes

References

External links
 

Shoes
Kanye West
Products introduced in 2015
Hip hop fashion
American fashion
Street fashion
African-American culture
2010s fashion
2020s fashion
Products and services discontinued in 2022